Vishwa Thulasi is a 2004 Tamil-language drama film directed by Sumathy Ram, starring Mammooty and Nandita Das. This film's score and soundtrack were composed by Ilayaraaja and M. S. Viswanathan. The film was notable for having a female director.

Plot
The film, set in the 1940s and moving to the 1960s, revolves around the emotional story of Thulasi returning to her village to become a dance teacher. She cannot bring herself to forget Vishwa, a man she has been in love with for two decades. Memories of Vishwa haunt her constantly, and upon a chance meeting with him, she discovers he too is struggling with his love for her. Both are haunted by the memory of Thulasi's cousin, a figure who is unable to control his obsession for his cousin and hide his resentment at Thulasi's feelings for Vishwa.

Thulasi comes to Sundarapuri after her guardians — her grandma and uncle — pass away, to work as teacher in a dance school. It is in Sundarapuri that Vishwa, the Zamindar whom she had met 20 years ago, lives. They meet again and the feelings that had blossomed in their hearts as teenagers, are revived. Vishwa is unmarried and Thulasi has gone through an unceremonious ritual in the name of matrimony, but fear of societal stigma and innate inhibition keep them asunder.

Sensing their intense love for each other, Pattabhi, the manager at Vishwa's house, helps them overcome their fears. It is then that fate enters in the form of Shiva.

Cast

Mammootty as Vishwa
Nandita Das as Thulasi
Manoj K. Jayan as Shiva
Delhi Ganesh as Pattabhi
Sukumari as Vishwa's mother
Manivannan
Madhan Bob
Kovai Sarala
Vaiyapuri
Kamala Kamesh
Rajesh Vaidya
Ambili Devi as Young Thulasi

Soundtrack
All the songs were composed and orchestrated by M. S. Viswanathan. Background score of the movie was done by Ilaiyaraaja.

Reception 
Malini Mannath of Chennai Online wrote that "Though one can appreciate the debutant director's sincerity to give a clean, aesthetic, lyrical film, quite different from the dance-fight-romance routine, one feels 'Vishwa Thulasi' would have made a pleasant video-album. Stretching it to two hours, is stretching it a bit too much!"

Awards
The film has won the following awards since its release:

2005 WorldFest Houston (United States) 
 Won - Gold Remi Award - Music Score - Ilaiyaraaja, M. S. Viswanathan  
 Won - Gold Special Jury Award - First Feature - Vishwa Thulasi - Sumathy Ram

Tamil Nadu State Film Award
Won - Tamil Nadu State Film Award for Second Best Film - Second Prize, 2004
Won - Tamil Nadu State Film Award for best Choreography - 2004

References

External links

2004 films
Films set in the 1940s
Indian romantic musical films
Films scored by Ilaiyaraaja
Films scored by M. S. Viswanathan
2000s Tamil-language films
2000s romantic musical films
2004 directorial debut films